Estonia made their third Eurovision Song Contest appearance in 1997. The preselection for the Eurovision Song Contest 1997 final would follow the same format of previous years, with a judging panel selecting the song and artist that would represent Estonia in the final. The judges would eventually choose Maarja-Liis Ilus again, making her the first Estonian entrant to have made back-to-back appearances in the Eurovision Song Contest. In the final, Ilus finished 8th.

Before Eurovision

Eurolaul 1997 
The final took place at the Linnahall in Tallinn, Estonia, and was hosted by Marko Reikop and Anu Välba. Eight different songs were entered, with Pearu Paulus, Hanna-Liina Võsa and Maarja-Liis Ilus performing on more than one entry. A panel of international judges voted on each song, with Ilus' "Keelatud maa" winning by a large margin of 32 points.

Despite this large margin, a public telephone poll had voted the night before that "Aeg" by Ilus, Võsa and Anne Värvimann was the nation's favourite. Despite this, "Keelatud maa" became the Estonian entrant for the 1997 contest.

At Eurovision
On the night of the final, Ilus performed 13th, following Poland and preceding Bosnia and Herzegovina. She performed strongly again and at the end of the voting she received 82 points, placing 8th in a field of 25. The Estonian jury awarded its 12 points to France.

Voting

References

1997
Countries in the Eurovision Song Contest 1997
Eurovision